Nicholas Leader may refer to:

 Nicholas Leader (born 1773), Irish landowner, politician and businessman, Liberal MP for Kilkenny City 1830–1832
 His son Nicholas Leader (born 1808), Irish landowner, politician and businessman, Conservative MP for Cork County 1861–1868